Ahangar Mahalleh may refer to:
 Ahangar Mahalleh, Gilan
 Ahangar Mahalleh, Gorgan, Golestan Province
 Ahangar Mahalleh, Minudasht, Golestan Province
 Ahangar Mahalleh, alternate name of Tigh Zamin, Golestan Province